Yury Yevgenyevich Kozin (born 20 September 1948) is a retired Soviet heavyweight weightlifter who won a Soviet and a world title in 1971 and set six ratified world records in 1970–72: five in the press and one in the clean and jerk.

Kozin graduated from the Russian State University of Physical Education, Sport, Youth and Tourism, and after retiring from competitions worked as a weightlifting coach. He prepared Valery Yurov to the 1990 World Championships.

References

1948 births
Living people
Sportspeople from Moscow
Soviet male weightlifters
World Weightlifting Championships medalists